Roberto Gamarra (born 6 March 1958) is a former Argentine and naturalised Paraguayan professional football midfielder and currently manager.

After retiring as a player he coached teams in El Salvador.

Coaching career

Once Lobos
In 2005, Gamarra signed as new coach of Once Lobos, replacing Genaro Sermeño.

Atlético Balboa
In 2007, he signed as new coach of Atlético Balboa, replacing Gustavo de Simone. In January 2009, Gamarra was replaced by Carlos Alberto de Toro.

FAS
In January 2009, he was appointed as new coach of C.D. FAS. In 2010, Gamarra was replaced by Alberto Rujana.

Alianza FC
In March 2011, Gamarra was appointed as new coach of Alianza F.C., replacing Miloš Miljanić.

UES
In January 2012, Gamarra signed as new coach of UES, replacing Jorge Abrego. In September 2013, Gamarra was replaced by Ramiro Cepeda.

Luis Ángel Firpo
In March 2013, he was appointed as new coach of C.D. Luis Ángel Firpo, replacing Edgar Henríquez.

Dragón
In May 2014, Gamarra signed as new coach of C.D. Dragón, replacing Nelson Mauricio Ancheta. In February 2015, Gamarra was replaced by Santos Rivera.

Return to FAS
In March 2016, Gamarra was appointed as coach of FAS, replacing Carlos Martínez. In May 2016, Gamarra was replaced by Osvaldo Escudero.

Isidro Metapán
In December 2016, Gamarra was appointed as new coach of A.D. Isidro Metapán. In April 2017, Gamarra was replaced by assistant coach Álvaro Misael Alfaro.

L.D.U. Loja
In 2018, he signed with L.D.U. Loja.

Honours

Club 
C.D. FAS
 Primera División
 Champion: Apertura 2009

Alianza F.C.
 Primera División
 Champion: Clausura 2011

C.D. Luis Ángel Firpo
 Primera División
 Champion: Clausura 2013

References

External links
 Roberto Gamarra at Soccerway 

1958 births
Living people
Argentine footballers
Paraguayan football managers
Expatriate football managers in El Salvador
Argentine expatriate sportspeople in El Salvador
C.D. FAS managers
C.D. Luis Ángel Firpo managers
Universidad SC managers
Association football midfielders
Sportivo Luqueño managers
Club San José managers
Independiente Santa Fe managers
L.D.U. Loja managers